Keichousaurus (key-cho-saurus) is a genus of marine reptile in the pachypleurosaur family which went extinct at the close of the Triassic in the Triassic-Jurassic extinction event. The name derives from Kweichow (now Guizhou Province) in China where the first fossil specimen was discovered in 1957. They are among the most common sauropterygian fossils recovered and are often found as nearly complete, articulated skeletons, making them popular among collectors. Keichousaurus, and the pachypleurosaur family broadly, are sometimes classified within Nothosauroidea, but are otherwise listed as a separate, more primitive lineage within Sauropterygia.

Description
 
Keichousaurus, like all sauropterygians, was highly adapted to the aquatic environment. Most specimens had small body, males sexually mature with  snout-vent length (SVL), and in females by  SVL. Mean SVL for mature males is approximately  SVL, and for mature females, at most  SVL. It had both long necks and long tails, with elongated, five-toed feet. The pointed head and sharp teeth in this genus also indicate that they were fish-eaters. Some recovered specimens feature an especially developed ulna suggesting they may have spent some time on land or in marshes.

In addition fossil evidence suggest also a pair of fossilized pregnant marine reptiles called Keichousaurus hui, show they had a mobile pelvis to give birth to live young rather than laying eggs.

Morphology 
 
Keichousaurus hui was found in 1958 in Guizhou, China by  palaeontologist Hu Chengzhi.  This fossil is distinguished by its broad ulna which makes it unlike other European genera. The broad ulna increased the surface area of the forelimbs, making it more effective in locomotion. Keichousaurus shows many characteristics of its family Pachypleurosauridae such as its short snout and elongated temporal openings. Keichousaurus also had a long serpentine neck with a relatively small head and long tail. The anterior caudal vertebrae possess lateral transverse processes. The morphology of Keichousaurus is most like that of Dactylosaurus, showing long and narrow upper temporal openings that extends to the rear of the skull of which is not found in other pachypleurosaurids. Other differences from pachypleurosaurids include Keichousaurus' more robust humerus, very broad ulna, and slight hyperphalangy in the manus. The sternum was also lacking in this animal, and the forelimbs were more paddled-shaped, possibly indicating a greater importance of the forelimbs in movement. The pectoral girdle was formed by the paired clavicles, interclavical, scapulae, and coracoids. Keichousaurus was a primitive quadrupedal tetrapod with limbs laterally placed to the body. Different parts of Keichousaurus grew at different rates, a phenomenon called allometric growth.

Locomotion 
 
The locomotion of Keichousaurus probably resembled (in part) the "underwater flight" that plesiosaurs employed. The flattened forelimbs would likely have acted as hydrofoils. The hindlimbs show less specialization, and may therefore have acted as stabilizers and control surfaces, such as is seen in extant sea turtles. The intermediate nature of the limb morphology implies that there was also, to some extent, the kind of 'crawling through the water' seen in small freshwater turtles. The powerfully built pectoral girdle allowed for the attachment of strong muscles, but their location beneath the shoulder favours the underwater flight model. Despite the specialization of the limbs, the tail also shows adaptations to an aquatic existence. Lateral transverse processes of the anterior caudal vertebrae show that powerful muscles enabled the tail to beat or at least undulate from side to side. This would imply some distal lateral compression, but this is not recorded in soft-tissue preservation. The long neck was primarily concerned with prey-capture. The combination of powerful limbs and tail would have made K. hui an adept and maneuverable predator.

Reproduction 
Although there is no direct evidence, Keichosaurus was potentially ovoviviparous (eggs form and hatch within uterus). Fossil Keichousaurus display a simplified elbow joint and a lack of ossification in the olecranon process of the ulna. This would make crawling up the beach to lay eggs awkward. Specimens at different developmental stages, found in the same type of sediment at the same locality, also support an ovoviviparous reproduction model. However, fossils have been found of female Keichousaurus with fetuses within the lower portion of the thoracic cavity. Their position implies that they are not victims of cannibalism.

References

 
 peripstus.com/Keichousaurus
 Functional morphology and ontogeny of Keichousaurus hui

Pachypleurosaurs
Triassic sauropterygians
Early Triassic reptiles of Asia
Middle Triassic reptiles of Asia
Late Triassic reptiles of Asia
Olenekian first appearances
Carnian extinctions
Taxa named by Yang Zhongjian
Fossil taxa described in 1958
Sauropterygian genera